Lisa Marie Bezzina (born 5 November 1979) is a Maltese long-distance runner. She won the gold medal in both the women's 5000 metres and women's 10,000 metres events at the 2019 Games of the Small States of Europe held Budva, Montenegro.

Career 

In 2015, she competed in the women's 3000 metres event at the European Games held in Baku, Azerbaijan.

In 2018, she competed in the women's half marathon at the 2018 IAAF World Half Marathon Championships held in Valencia, Spain. She also competed in the women's half marathon at the 2018 Mediterranean Games held in Tarragona, Spain. She finished in 9th place.

In 2019, she competed in the senior women's race at the 2019 IAAF World Cross Country Championships. She finished in 104th place.

In 2020, she competed in the women's half marathon at the World Athletics Half Marathon Championships held in Gdynia, Poland.

References

External links 
 

Living people
1979 births
Place of birth missing (living people)
Maltese female long-distance runners
Athletes (track and field) at the 2015 European Games
European Games competitors for Malta
Athletes (track and field) at the 2018 Mediterranean Games
Athletes (track and field) at the 2022 Mediterranean Games
Mediterranean Games competitors for Malta
20th-century Maltese women
21st-century Maltese women